The 1972 Anglo-Italian Cup was the third staging of the Anglo-Italian Cup, an annual association football tournament between clubs from England and Italy. It featured twelve teams — six from each country.

The competition started on 1 June 1972 and concluded on 24 June 1972 with the final match between the winners of the English and Italian sections of the competition. Roma beat the 1971 winners, Blackpool, by three goals to one in the Stadio Olimpico in Rome.

Details
The twelve participating teams were divided into three groups of four, each group comprising two teams from England and two from Italy. Each team played the two teams from the other country, once at home and once away. The teams were then ranked against teams from their own country on a league basis, and the top ranked teams from each country played off in a final for the trophy.

Participating teams

Group results

Group 1

Group 2

Group 3

Final rankings

Total points were determined by points gained (two for a win, one for a draw) plus goals scored.

Final

References

General
 

Specific

Anglo-Italian Cup
Anglo-Italian Cup
1972